Star Time or Startime may refer to:

 Star Time (album), a 1991 box set by James Brown
 Star Time (film), a 1992 American horror film
 Star Time (TV series), a 1950–1951 American variety show that aired on the DuMont network
 Startime (American TV series), a 1959–1960 American anthology series that was broadcast on NBC
 Startime (Australian TV series), a 1962–1963 Australian variety show
 Startime International, a record label
 "Star Time 1", a song by Squarepusher from the 2009 album Numbers Lucent